The Ambassador of Australia to the Russian Federation is an officer of the Australian Department of Foreign Affairs and Trade and the head of the Embassy of the Commonwealth of Australia to the Russian Federation. The position has the rank and status of an Ambassador Extraordinary and Plenipotentiary and holds non-resident accreditation for Kazakhstan, Uzbekistan, Kyrgyzstan, Turkmenistan, Tajikistan, Armenia and Belarus. The current ambassador since February 2020 is Graeme Meehan.

Posting history
Russia and Australia have enjoyed diplomatic relations since 1942, when Australia opened channels with the Soviet Union. This occurred on 13 October 1942 with the conclusion of negotiations between Foreign Ministers Herbert Evatt and Vyacheslav Molotov. The Australian Legation opened in January 1943 (the first Minister, Bill Slater was appointed in October 1942) in the temporary Russian capital of Kuybyshev and the Soviet embassy in Canberra also opened in March 1943.

By the war's end the legation moved to Moscow and on 16 February 1948 was upgraded to an embassy. In February 1950 the ambassador Alan Watt was recalled by the Australian government and was not replaced. In April 1954 with the scandal of the Petrov Affair the embassy in Moscow was closed, but later reopened in 1959. Between 1964 and 1966, the ambassador in Moscow held accreditation as Ambassador to Sweden. Between June 1972 and September 1973, the ambassador in Moscow was accredited to Warsaw. With the dissolution of the Soviet Union in late 1991, Australia acted to recognise the new states of the Commonwealth of Independent States on 26 December 1991. As a result, the embassy's accreditation was transferred to the Russian Federation, while non-resident accreditation to many of the new former Soviet republics was acquired. Non-resident accreditation with the Ukraine was consequently included from 10 January 1992, but was transferred to the new embassy established in Kyiv in February 2015 following the Euromaidan protests across Ukraine. From 12 June 1973 to 29 May 1991, accreditation to Mongolia was also held by the embassy in Moscow until it was transferred to the Embassy in Beijing. Accreditation for Azerbaijan (since 1991) and Georgia (since 1992) was transferred to the Embassy in Ankara, Turkey in 2011. Accreditation for Moldova was transferred to the Embassy in Kyiv, Ukraine in 2019.

The Australian Government established an embassy in Almaty, Kazakhstan in 1995 and appointed its first resident ambassador, Douglas Townsend. The Australian Government announced plans to close its embassy in Kazakhstan in August 1999. According to the Department of Foreign Affairs and Trade, the closure was due to resource constraints.

Officeholders

Heads of mission

Notes
: Also served as non-resident Ambassador of Australia to Sweden, between 1964 and 1966.
: Also served as non-resident Ambassador of Australia to Poland, between June 1972 and September 1973.
: Also served as non-resident Ambassador of Australia to Ukraine, between 10 January 1992 and February 2015.
: Also served as non-resident Ambassador of Australia to Mongolia, between 12 June 1973 to 29 May 1991.
: Also served as non-resident Ambassador of Australia to the Republic of Azerbaijan between 26 December 1991 and 2011.
: Also served as non-resident Ambassador of Australia to Georgia, between 1992 and 2011.
: Also served as non-resident Ambassador of Australia to the Republic of Uzbekistan, since 26 December 1991.
: Also served as non-resident Ambassador of Australia to the Republic of Kazakhstan, between 26 December 1991 and June 1995, and since 1999.
: Also served as non-resident Ambassador of Australia to the Kyrgyz Republic, since 26 December 1991.
: Also served as non-resident Ambassador of Australia to Turkmenistan, since 26 December 1991.
: Also served as non-resident Ambassador of Australia to the Republic of Tajikistan, since 26 December 1991.
: Also served as non-resident Ambassador of Australia to the Republic of Armenia, since 26 December 1991.
: Also served as non-resident Ambassador of Australia to the Republic of Belarus, since 26 December 1991.

Ambassadors to Kazakhstan

See also
Russia-Australia relations
Foreign relations of Australia

References

External links

 Australian Embassy, Russian Federation

Australia–Russia relations
 
 
 
 
 
 
 
 
 
 
 
 
 
Russia
Australia
Australia